Shallan Meiers (born September 30, 1981) is an American model and actress. She was born in San Diego, California.

She was chosen as Playboy's Playmate of the Month for September, 2002 after appearing on the TV special Who Wants to Be a Playboy Centerfold?, that was broadcast on Fox in May 2002.  Meiers was a second runner-up, losing to Lauren Anderson and Christina Santiago. All three would eventually become Playmates.

References

External links
 
 Shallan Meiers on Myspace

American actresses
2000s Playboy Playmates
1981 births
Living people
21st-century American women